Red Vietnam may refer to:
Democratic Republic of Vietnam
Socialist Republic of Vietnam